Garh Panchkot is a ruined fort located in the eastern part of India at the foothills of Panchet Hill in the district of Purulia, West Bengal.  The ruins of the Panchkot Palace are a silent testimony to the Bargi attack during the 18th century.

History 

From a historical perspective Alivardi Khan had become the Nawab of Bengal in April 1740, having defeated and killed Sarfiraz Khan. Rustam Jung, Sarfiraz's brother-in-law, challenged Alivardi Khan but failed in his endeavours which prompted him to seek the help of the Maratha Rulers of Nagpur, Raghoji Bhonsle. A Maratha cavalry was sent by Bhosle who entered Bengal through Panchet and started looting the countryside. These Maratha men came to be known as "Bargi's". For about 10 years they looted and plundered Bengal. It ended in the year 1751 after a settlement was reached between the Nawab of Bengal and Maratha King.

During one of these encounters, Garh Panchkot was attacked by the "Bargi" and, having defeated the King's guards, they destroyed it after looting and plundering the palace. It is believed that all the 17 wives of the king committed suicide in a nearby well during the attack. Garh Panchkot has lain in ruin ever since.

Geography

Location

Note: The map alongside presents some of the notable locations in the subdivision. All places marked in the map are linked in the larger full screen map.

Fort 
In the fort's construction a combination of natural and man made resources were used to build it.

A semicircular moat was built which started from one end of the foothill to the other end. The only way to enter was by crossing the moat by using a boat at the centre of the semicircle. The rest of the area was either inaccessible due to large growth of a special type of bamboo tree which grew thick wild making it very difficult for intruders as well as a thick and high stone wall that was constructed.

600 feet above in the middle of the Panchakot Hill were the guard's quarters. In contrast to the architecture of the palace below, it was completely made of large stone slabs.

The guard's quarter has a strategic position. Spread over a 500 square meters area is more of a miniature fort surrounded by solid rock walls with only one entry point, the pyramid like hollow gate from where the entire palace below and the surroundings could be watched.

Once inside the fort, on the right as well as left there are two long and narrow rooms with small vents overlooking the plains. In the centre stands a stone temple dedicated to Rama the king of ayodhya, this signifies that it was truly a guards quarter as more appropriately the people who guarded the area were the elite warriors and generally worshiped Rama as he represented strength, courage and who had fought many wars. From the other remains one can't ascertain the true nature of its usefulness; a hollow lions head made of stone known as the "Singh Mukh" or other artefacts mostly made of stone.

Features

Temples 
The king was a Rajput chieftain who believed in Shaktism, although the temples reflect his inclination towards Vaishnavism. This could be due to the influence of Chaitanya Mahaprabhu, a proponent of Vaishnavism, during that period. The two distinctive architectural styles, which are evident from the temples, are the Bishnupuri style and a much older architectural style of using stone blocks. It is believed that the Bishnupuri styled temples housed Krishna and the followers were mostly vegetarians whereas the Stone Temples housed the figure of Kali and the followers were non-vegetarians and also believed in animal sacrifice. This lends credence to the fact that the King was tolerant towards other beliefs as one more Jain cave can be found in the vicinity.

There is another very old stone temple, which is dedicated to Rama. This could be because it is believed that most of the Hindu Kings of India were Raghu-Vanshis or descendants of Rama and his legendary ancestral kings as per the Hindu epic Ramayana.

Guard's quarter 
At 600 feet above sea level in the middle of Panchakot Hill, the guard's quarter stands as a formidable fort.

Defense moat 
The "Singha-dwar" was the only entrance to the area.  Today, the moat has been reduced to a mere pond with a road running through the middle of it.  A broken entrance gate for the boats is what remains of the once famous "Singh Dwar". After crossing the Singha Dwar it is about 7 km to the Palace.  The curved road is through the bamboo bush, which was planted as a second line of defence. Even during the middle of the afternoon the road is dark due to the bamboo bush along the roadside.

Arms and ammunition 
During those days in India, warfare was mainly fought with bows and arrows, spear, swords, daggers, cannons, etc. It was sheer strategy and numbers that mattered, not the arms. In a phased-out manner it started with sword fights.  The army here consisted of foot soldiers, an infantry of horse riders, and elephants.

Palace – Rani Mahal 
Not much information is available but given the arches and the pillars scattered across an area of about 20,000 sq feet, the Palace alone would have been a massive structure. As legend has it, the king had 17 wives and they all stayed in this palace lending credence to its size.
The material used to build the Rani Mahal is a bit different from that of the temples and the Guard's quarter. It uses "Choon Surki" or a paste made of lime and powered clay bricks fused using water as a base to hold the fire clay bricks. This style of masonry was quite prevalent in that particular period and it still exists. The arches on the other hand mimic the Moghul architecture which indicates that the Rani Mahal was built later, possibly during the 16th century AD compared to the stone temples which are nearby.

Maratha attack 
There is enough evidence that dacoits from Maharashtra came to this remote part of West Bengal during 1760.

The popular belief is that the Marathas ransacked the King's palace. Dishonored and defeated the King retreated to Kashipur.

"Borgi elo deshe khajna debo kise" is a very common phrase in the villages near Garh Panchokot which literally means – The Marathas have come to our place how will we pay the taxes!

Image Gallery

References
Garh Panchakot

External links

 See pictures of  Garh Panchakot
 See video of  Garh Panchakot

Tourist attractions in Purulia district
Palaces in West Bengal